Janel Brandtjen (born March 27, 1966) is an American businesswoman and far-right politician from Waukesha County, Wisconsin.  She is a member of the Wisconsin State Assembly, representing the 22nd Assembly district since January 2015.

Biography 
Born in Milwaukee, Wisconsin, Brandjten received a Bachelor of Business Administration in Finance and Marketing from University of Wisconsin–Milwaukee. Brandtjen is married and has two children. Together with her husband, Brandtjen owns Group One Marketing, an advertising agency in Menomonee Falls. The company received two PPP loans of $31,111 and $30,902, both of which were forgiven.

She was elected to the Waukesha County Board of Supervisors in 2008 and served until 2016.

Legislative career

On November 4, 2014, Brandtjen was elected to the Wisconsin State Assembly in Wisconsin's 22nd Assembly district, covering northeast Waukesha County and southwest Washington County. 
In the Wisconsin State Assembly, she has pushed for legislation to prohibit the use of fetal tissue in research.

After Joe Biden won Wisconsin in the 2020 presidential election and President Donald Trump refused to concede, Brandtjen claimed that there had been fraud and that Trump won Wisconsin. She said, "There is no doubt that... Donald Trump won this election in Wisconsin and several methods of fraud were used to change the outcome."  Brandtjen remained a steadfast supporter of Trump's fraud claims and made several attempts to use her position as chair of the Assembly committee on campaigns and elections to further election-skeptic initiatives, like the year-long investigation by former Wisconsin Supreme Court justice Michael Gableman, which ultimately turned up no evidence of fraud.  She also supported a bill to "de-certify" the results of the 2020 election—Republican Assembly speaker Robin Vos reacted by saying that this was not legally possible.  Brandtjen then took the unprecedented step of supporting a primary challenge against Vos, which nearly cost him his seat in 2022.

Brandtjen's activities around the 2020 election and her clashes Vos and other leaders in the Republican caucus eventually led to sanctions from the caucus.  The week after the 2022 election, the Republican Assembly caucus voted to bar her from attending any further closed meetings of the caucus, saying that they had lost trust in her.  Vos also subsequently stripped Brandtjen of her chairmanship of the Assembly campaigns and elections committee.

On December 6, 2022, Brandtjen announced that she was running in the special election for the 8th state senate district after incumbent Alberta Darling resigned. Brandtjen faced Dan Knodl and Van Mobley in the Republican primary race. Knodl won and will face Democrat Jodi Habush Sinynkin on the 4th of April.

References

External links

1966 births
Living people
People from Menomonee Falls, Wisconsin
University of Wisconsin–Milwaukee alumni
Businesspeople from Milwaukee
Women state legislators in Wisconsin
County supervisors in Wisconsin
Republican Party members of the Wisconsin State Assembly
21st-century American politicians
21st-century American women politicians